Sorkheh (also Romanized as Surkheh; in  Sūr; literally "the red one") is a city in and the capital of Sorkheh County, in Semnan Province, Iran. At the 2006 census, its population was 9,062, in 2,686 families. Sorkhei, a Semnani Persian dialect and language, is still spoken by some of its inhabitants.

Notable people 
 Hassan Rouhani (born 1948), 7th President of Iran
 Sahebeh Rouhani (born 1954), Iran's first lady (Hassan Rouhani's wife)
 Hossein Fereydoun (born 1957), Iranian politician.
 Ali Asqar Peyvandi (born 1962), Iranian physician and politician.
 Ruhollah Isari (born 1992), Futsal player.

References

Cities in Semnan Province
Populated places in Sorkheh County